Geoffrey Simpson is an Australian cinematographer. He has received critical praise for his work on films including Shine, Oscar and Lucinda (1997) and Romulus, My Father (2007). He has won Australian Film Institute awards for Best Cinematography for The Navigator: A Medieval Odyssey (1988), Shine and Oscar and Lucinda.

He is a graduate of the London Film School.

Filmography

1981: Centrespread
1986: Playing Beatie Bow
1987: Jilted
1987: Initiation
1988: Boundaries of the Heart
1988: The Navigator: A Medieval Odyssey
1988: Celia
1990: Till There Was You
1990: Green Card
1991: Fried Green Tomatoes
1992: The Last Days of Chez Nous
1993: Mr. Wonderful
1994: The War
1994: Little Women
1996: Shine
1996: Some Mother's Son
1997: Oscar and Lucinda
1999: Life
2000: Center Stage
2001: Glitter
2002: Black and White
2003: Paradise Found
2003: Under the Tuscan Sun
2006: Last Holiday
2007: Romulus, My Father
2008: The Tender Hook
2008: Ali & the Ball
2009: Dear Diary
2011: The Dragon Pearl
2011: Sleeping Beauty
2012: The Sessions
2012: Satellite Boy
2017: Cargo
2017: Please Stand By

References

External links

Australian cinematographers
Living people
Year of birth missing (living people)
Alumni of the London Film School